Magna Park can refer to:

Magna Park, Lutterworth, a distribution centre in Leicester, UK, one of the largest in Europe
Magna Park, Milton Keynes, road distribution centre
Magna Park, Peterborough, rail road distribution centre (planned)